Ratnovo is a rural locality (a village) in Danilovskoye Rural Settlement, Melenkovsky District, Vladimir Oblast, Russia. The population was 176 as of 2010.

Geography 
Ratnovo is located 7 km west of Melenki (the district's administrative centre) by road. Bolshoy Priklon is the nearest rural locality.

References 

Rural localities in Melenkovsky District